Rosemary Anne Lauder (living in 2015), of North Devon, England, is a historian of the county of Devon. She started her writing career in the 1980s as a journalist contributing articles on the subject of gardening, in which she retains a strong interest. She received an MA in Garden History from the University of Bristol. She is a long-standing member of the Devon Gardens Trust, in which organisation she plays an active role. She is author and publisher of many books and booklets on the topics of walking in North Devon, the topography of Exmoor and North Devon, and the history of the region. She lived for five years in a former gardener's cottage rented from the Tapeley Park estate in the parish of Westleigh, North Devon. Her historical works concentrate especially on the landed gentry of Devonshire and their mansions and estates, most notably Vanished Houses (1981 and 1997) and Devon Families (2002). Several of her works have been published by Devon's Heritage.

List of works
Vanished Houses of North Devon, 1981, 2nd edition 2005
A Guide to Instow and Its Neighbours Fremington, Yelland & Westleigh, 1981
Strange Stories from Devon, with Michael Williams, 1982
Views of Old Devon, 1982
Villages of North Devon, 1982
Market Towns of North Devon, 1983
Exmoor in the Old Days, 1983
An Anthology for North Devon, 1983
Westward Ho! to Welcombe: a Guide to Coast and Country Including Bideford and Torrington, with Frank Scrivener, 1984 
Lundy: Puffin Island, 1984
Unknown Devon, with Michael Williams, 1984
A Tale of Two Rivers, with William Atkins, 1986
Seven Days in North Devon, 1986
A Picture of Devon, 1989
A Walker's Guide to North Devon, 1991
Exmoor Travellers, 1993 
Vanished Landmarks of North Devon, 1994  
Bideford, Appledore, Instow and Westward Ho!, 1996 
Vanished Houses of South Devon, 1997
Devon Families, 2002 
The Devon Gardens Guide, 2004
Bideford: North Devon's Ancient Port and Market Town: A Guide to the Town of Bideford Including a Map, a Walk About the Town, and Bideford's Past

Journal of Devon Gardens Trust
Lauder's articles published in the Journal of Devon Gardens Trust include:
The Lost Landscape of Tapeley Park, 2009

References

Historians of Devon
Topographers of Devon
Year of birth missing (living people)
Living people
Alumni of the University of Bristol